The 2020 Vuelta a España is the 75th edition of the Vuelta a España, one of cycling's Grand Tours. The Vuelta began in Irun with a hilly stage on 20 October, and Stage 9 occurred on 29 October with a stage to Aguilar de Campoo. The race finished in Madrid on 8 November.

Classification standings

Stage 1
20 October 2020 – Irun to Arrate,

Stage 2
21 October 2020 – Pamplona to Lekunberri,

Stage 3
22 October 2020 – Lodosa to Laguna Negra de Urbión (Vinuesa),

Stage 4
23 October 2020 – Garray to Ejea de los Caballeros,

Stage 5
24 October 2020 – Huesca to Sabiñánigo,

Stage 6
25 October 2020 – Biescas to Aramón Formigal,

Rest day 1
26 October 2020 – Vitoria-Gasteiz

Stage 7
27 October 2020 – Vitoria-Gasteiz to Villanueva de Valdegovia,

Stage 8
28 October 2020 – Logroño to Alto de Moncalvillo,

Stage 9
29 October 2020 – Castrillo del Val to Aguilar de Campoo, 

References

2020 Vuelta a España
Vuelta a España stages